Dustin Brown and František Čermák were the defending champions but chose not to participate.

Bai Yan and Li Zhe won the title, defeating Sander Arends and Tristan-Samuel Weissborn 6–3, 3–6, [11–9] in the final.

Seeds

Draw

References
 Main Draw

Garden Open - Doubles